is a Japanese stage actress and voice actress. She played the role of Miki Kaoru in the musical adaptation of Revolutionary Girl Utena.

Filmography
Hiromi Ohara in Kochikame
Eimi Date / Love-Me Eimy in Magical Girl Pretty Samy TV
Matsuno in Tenchi in Tokyo

External links
 

1974 births
Living people
Actresses from Tokyo
Japanese voice actresses